The Karuk are a Native American people from what is now California. Karuk may also refer to:

Karuk language, their language
Karuk Tribe, a federally recognized tribe of Karuk
Karuk, Kerman, a village in Narmashir County, Iran

See also
Boneh Karuk, a village in Bagh-e Malek County, Iran
Estakhr-e Garuk (also romanized Estakhr-e Karuk), a village in Jiroft County, Iran
Koruk (disambiguation)